Ytterlännäs is a parish in the Diocese of Härnösand in Västernorrland County, Sweden. Ytterlännäs parish contains Sweden's oldest continuous choir.

History
Ytterlännäs parish, in the province of Ångermanland, belonged to the Archdiocese of Uppsala in the Middle Ages, but has been part of the Diocese of Härnösand since the diocese's formation in 1647. The two churches of the parish, the old one from the early 13th century, and the new one, built from 1848 to 1854, are located between the communities of Nyland and Bollstabruk, within Kramfors Municipality.

The Ytterlännäs Old Church dates from the 13th century and features medieval vaults, wall-paintings and wooden sculptures. It has baroque furnishings that include two galleries. The Ytterlännäs Madonna is an example of the work from the Hälsingland workshop of Haaken Gulleson. The church is in an excellent state of preservation from being unused since 1854.

The Ytterlännäs New Church was completed in 1854 and is an example of the Tegnér barn style.

Assistant vicars
"Komministrar i Ytterlännäs"

Music directors
"Kyrkomusiker i Ytterlännäs"

External links

Ytterlännäs at Flickr
The Old Church - history, presentation, activities

References

Ångermanland
Västernorrland County
Diocese of Härnösand
Parishes of the Church of Sweden